Aylam Orian is an American actor, who plays the role of Dr. Wilhelm Brücke, the high-ranking Nazi officer, occultist and series main antagonist, in the MGM limited web series Stargate Origins (2018).

As a vegan and supporter of animal rights, Orian founded The National Animal Rights Day in Israel and wrote the Declaration of Animal Rights.

References

External links
 
 

Living people
21st-century American male actors
American male television actors
Year of birth missing (living people)
Place of birth missing (living people)